Elizabethtown is a town in Bladen County, North Carolina, United States. The population was 3,583 at the 2010 census. It is the county seat of Bladen County.

History
Some hold Elizabethtown is named for Elizabeth, the wife of George Carteret, while others believe it was named for the love interest of a local landowner.

In the 1970s Elizabethtown more than doubled its size through annexation, increasing from about 1400 square feet to 3700 square feet in area.

The Mt. Horeb Presbyterian Church and Cemetery and Trinity Methodist Church are listed on the National Register of Historic Places.

Geography
Elizabethtown is located at  (34.625691, −78.612270).

Browns Creek, a tributary to the Cape Fear River, drains the south side of Elizabethtown.

Demographics

2020 census

As of the 2020 United States Census, there were 3,296 people, 1,482 households, and 750 families residing in the town.

2000 census
As of the census of 2000, there were 3,698 people, 1,536 households, and 907 families residing in the town. The population density was 805.9 people per square mile (311.1/km2). There were 1,688 housing units at an average density of 367.9 per square mile (142.0/km2). The racial makeup of the town was 48.05% White, 48.97% African American, 0.43% Native American, 0.30% Asian, 0.03% Pacific Islander, 1.30% from other races, and 0.92% from two or more races. Hispanic or Latino of any race were 2.54% of the population.

There were 1,536 households, out of which 26.6% had children under the age of 18 living with them, 36.4% were married couples living together, 19.2% had a female householder with no husband present, and 40.9% were non-families. 38.6% of all households were made up of individuals, and 16.6% had someone living alone who was 65 years of age or older. The average household size was 2.21 and the average family size was 2.93.

In the town, the population was spread out, with 22.4% under the age of 18, 7.7% from 18 to 24, 23.8% from 25 to 44, 24.4% from 45 to 64, and 21.7% who were 65 years of age or older. The median age was 42 years. For every 100 females, there were 79.9 males. For every 100 females age 18 and over, there were 72.5 males.

The median income for a household in the town was $21,944, and the median income for a family was $38,750. Males had a median income of $36,133 versus $25,417 for females. The per capita income for the town was $15,303. About 24.6% of families and 31.1% of the population were below the poverty line, including 47.3% of those under age 18 and 27.8% of those age 65 or over.

References

External links
 Town of Elizabethtown official website
 Bladen Journal, Google news archive. —PDFs of 2,696 issues, dating from 1929 to 1985.

Towns in Bladen County, North Carolina
Towns in North Carolina
County seats in North Carolina